Kosmos 2447 ( meaning Cosmos 2447) is one of a set of three Russian military satellites launched in 2008 as part of the GLONASS satellite navigation system. It was launched with Kosmos 2448 and Kosmos 2449.

This satellite is a GLONASS-M satellite, also known as Uragan-M, and is numbered Uragan-M No. 727.

Kosmos 2447/8/9 were launched from Site 81/24 at Baikonur Cosmodrome in Kazakhstan. A Proton-M carrier rocket with a Blok DM upper stage was used to perform the launch which took place at 10:43 UTC on 25 December 2008. The launch successfully placed the satellites into Medium Earth orbit. It subsequently received its Kosmos designation, and the international designator 2008-067A. The United States Space Command assigned it the Satellite Catalog Number 33466.

It is not currently part of the GLONASS constellation. It was in orbital slot 3 but was taken out of service on 8 September 2010 due to equipment failure.

See also
List of Kosmos satellites (2251–2500)
List of Proton launches (2000–2009)

References

Spacecraft launched in 2008
Spacecraft launched by Proton rockets
Kosmos satellites